Cecil Ivan Bell Jr.  (born May 17, 1962) is a Republican member of the Texas House of Representatives for District 3, which encompasses Waller County and a portion of populous Montgomery County in Southeast Texas.

Politics
Bell serves on the Appropriations and Land & Resource Management committees and the subcommittee on Articles VI, VII & VIII.

In January 2015, Bell introduced legislation, HB 623, that prevents salary, pension, and other benefits from being paid to any Texas state employee who issues a same-sex marriage license. The bill included a provision to forestall legal action challenging the proposed law by mandating that state courts dismiss any such challenges and award court costs and attorney fees to the state. The bill died in committee.

Bell supports expanding career and technology training at public high schools so that students can enter the job market with a career certification but without following the college or university route.

In 2015, Bell sought unsuccessfully to prohibit the State of Texas from complying with Obergefell v. Hodges, the United States Supreme Court legal opinion sanctioning same-sex marriage. In 2017, Bell introduced a more comprehensive bill to allow his state to declare federal laws and court decisions unconstitutional and therefore unenforceable within the boundaries of Texas. Bell has proposed that federal treaties and presidential executive orders be subject to state scrutiny to block actions which the state considers unconstitutional. The legislation would establish a 12-member Joint Legislative Committee on Constitutional Enforcement, with six members each from the House and the Texas State Senate, to consider federal actions in light of constitutional interpretation in 1787. "I think it is important for patriotic Americans to recognize the strength and necessity of our Constitution. It is also important that we defend that Constitution,” Bell told the Texas House Select Committee on State and Federal Power and Responsibility.

Bell is a member of the Texas State Guard.

Bell won his fourth legislative term in the general election held on November 6, 2018. With 48,562 votes (76 percent), he handily defeated Democrat Lisa Seger, who polled 15,314 (24 percent).

On January 25, 2019, Bell, along with Steve Toth and Will Metcalf, filed House Bill 1042, which would require Texas schools and law enforcement agencies to establish active shooter response plans and law enforcement agencies to conduct annual drills while also requiring law enforcement to immediately contain or eliminate a threat.

Bell authored a bill in the Texas House, HB 347 of the 86th Session, to ban the process of forced annexation by cities over suburban and rural areas.  The bill will require a Texas city to get the approval of the people and businesses that are affected by the annexation. It passed both chambers of the Texas legislature and was signed by Governor Greg Abbott on May 24, 2019.

Electoral history
2012

2014

2016

2018

References

External links
 Cecil Bell Jr. for State Representative
 State legislative page
 Cecil Bell Jr. at the Texas Tribune

1962 births
Living people
Republican Party members of the Texas House of Representatives
People from Rosenberg, Texas
People from Magnolia, Texas
Businesspeople from Texas
21st-century American politicians